Lierse won the title of the 1996–97 season.

Relegated teams

These teams were relegated to the second division at the end of the season:
KV Mechelen
Cercle Brugge

Final league table

Results

References

Belgian Pro League seasons
Belgian
1996–97 in Belgian football